George Gower (c. 1540–1596) was an English portrait painter who became Serjeant Painter to Queen Elizabeth I in 1581.

Biography
Very little is known about his early life except that he was a grandson of Sir John Gower of Stittenham, North Yorkshire.

His earliest documented works are the two 1573 companion portraits of Sir Thomas Kytson and his wife Lady Kytson, now in the Tate Gallery in London.

Gower painted a self-portrait in 1579 (right) that shows his coat of arms and his artist's tools of his trade.  An allegorical device shows a balance with an artist's dividers outweighing the family coat of arms, "a startling claim in England where a painter was still viewed as little more than an artisan."

Gower is also famous for painting the Plimpton "Sieve" Portrait of Queen Elizabeth in 1579, now at the Folger Shakespeare Library. The sieve that Elizabeth carries signifies the Roman vestal virgin Tuccia, who carried water in a sieve to prove her chastity, thus representing Elizabeth's status as a virgin queen. The globe over her right shoulder symbolizes her position as the leader of global empire.

Gower was appointed to the position of Serjeant Painter to Queen Elizabeth in 1581. This allowed him to paint most of England’s aristocracy. The post also made him responsible for painted decoration at the royal residences, and on coaches and furniture. Among his works were a fountain (now destroyed) and the astronomical clock, both at Hampton Court Palace. He also inspected portraits of the Queen by other artists prior to their official release.

The version of the Armada Portrait of Elizabeth now at Woburn Abbey, painted to commemorate the 1588 defeat of the Spanish Armada, was formerly attributed to Gower, as was a cut down version in the National Portrait Gallery (United Kingdom).  All three extant versions are now thought to be the work of different unknown English artists.

Gower died in London.

Gallery

See also
Artists of the Tudor court
Portraiture of Elizabeth I
Serjeant Painter

Notes

References
Cooper, Tarnya and Charlotte Bolland: The Real Tudors : kings and queens rediscovered., London: National Portrait Gallery  (Cooper and Bolland 2014)
Biography of George Gower The National Maritime Museum Art Gallery. Accessed October 2007
Gower, George at the Union List of Artists Names, The J. Paul Getty Trust. Accessed October 2007
Portraits by Gower at the Tate Britain Gallery in London. Accessed October 2007
Hearn, Karen, ed. Dynasties: Painting in Tudor and Jacobean England 1530-1630.  New York: Rizzoli, 1995.  .
Strong, Roy: The English Icon: Elizabethan and Jacobean Portraiture, 1969, Routledge & Kegan Paul, London (Strong 1969)
Strong, Roy: Gloriana: The Portraits of Queen Elizabeth I'', Thames and Hudson, 1987,  (Strong 1987)

External links 

1540s births
1596 deaths
Leveson-Gower family
16th-century English painters
English male painters
English portrait painters
Portrait miniaturists
Court painters